John Jenkins (July 7, 1896, in Bosworth, Missouri – August 3, 1968, in Columbia, Missouri) was a professional baseball player for the Chicago White Sox in Major League Baseball.

References

1896 births
1968 deaths
Chicago White Sox players
Baseball players from Missouri